Tai Ho Wan (also ) is a bay on the north shore of Lantau Island in the New Territories of Hong Kong. The surrounding land was originally planned to be part of the North Lantau New Town scope, but there is a current slowdown in its plans because of the lack in population growth and environmental groups opposed to the next in abeyance.

Tai Ho was originally a rural area, to the northern part there is a shoal extend and to the southern part is the foot of Lin Fa Shan. Slopes are covered with grassland and shrub forests. There are monsoonal nature of swamps, as well as a stream named Tai Ho Stream which flows into the Tai Ho Bay.

History
In 1989, the British Hong Kong Government announced that the Airport Core Programme, which includes the north through the Tai Ho, North Lantau Highway, and the development of Tai Ho into new towns. The plans for the Tung Chung line was released at this time which also called for the construction of a Tai Ho station. However, in the late 1990s, due to the slow down in the development of Tung Chung, the expected slow down in population growth, coupled with environmental concerns that the development of Tai Ho will affect the local environment and ecology, large-scale construction is still under review.

Villages
Villages in the area include Tai Ho Village, Tai Ho New Village and Ngau Kwu Long. Tai Wo and Ngau Kwu Long are recognized villages under the New Territories Small House Policy.

Tai Ho Stream

Tai Ho Stream contains the largest varieties of freshwaterfish species in Hong Kong, with 47 species of fish. In 1999, the Hong Kong Government designated Tai Ho Stream as the 63rd Site of Special Scientific Interest due to the discovery of the Ayu (Plecoglossus altivelis) in the river, which cannot be found anywhere in the world except for waters in Hokkaidō, and Hong Kong.

References

External links

 Delineation of area of existing village Tai Ho (Mui Wo) for election of resident representative (2019 to 2022)
 Delineation of area of existing village Ngau Kwu Long (Mui Wo) for election of resident representative (2019 to 2022)

Lantau Island
Bays of Hong Kong